Potterton is a hamlet  north of Barwick-in-Elmet in City of Leeds, West Yorkshire, England. The hamlet falls within the Harewood ward of the Leeds Metropolitan Council.

The hamlet is described in the Domesday Book as being part of the Skyrack Wapentake and belonging to Earl Edwin. The name itself is said to derive from 'Pottere Tun', meaning 'The Potter's farmstead'.

The west wing of Potterton Hall was declared a Grade II* listed building in 1982.

South of Potterton lies the deserted medieval village of Potterton which includes many earthworks and a Holloway. The area is scheduled as an ancient monument.

See also
Listed buildings in Barwick in Elmet and Scholes

References

External links
 Barwick-in-Elmet Historical Society
 Leeds City Council

Hamlets in West Yorkshire
Places in Leeds